Aghuzbon (also Romanized as Āghūzbon) is a village in Feyziyeh Rural District, in the Central District of Babol County, Mazandaran Province, Iran. At the 2006 census, its population was 1,435, in 376 families.

References 

Populated places in Babol County